Keith Esmond Miller (20 June 1921 – 3 March 1987) was an Australian rules footballer who played with Geelong and North Melbourne in the Victorian Football League (VFL).

Miller also served in the Royal Australian Air Force during World War II.

Notes

External links 

1921 births
1987 deaths
Australian rules footballers from Victoria (Australia)
Geelong Football Club players
North Melbourne Football Club players
Military personnel from Victoria (Australia)
Royal Australian Air Force personnel of World War II